In mathematics, in the field of functional analysis, an indefinite inner product space

is an infinite-dimensional complex vector space  equipped with both an indefinite inner product

and a positive semi-definite inner product

where the metric operator  is an endomorphism of  obeying

The indefinite inner product space itself is not necessarily a Hilbert space; but the existence of a positive semi-definite inner product on  implies that one can form a quotient space on which there is a positive definite inner product.  Given a strong enough topology on this quotient space, it has the structure of a Hilbert space, and many objects of interest in typical applications fall into this quotient space.

An indefinite inner product space is called a Krein space (or -space) if  is positive definite and  possesses a majorant topology.  Krein spaces are named in honor of the Soviet mathematician Mark Grigorievich Krein (3 April 1907 – 17 October 1989).

Inner products and the metric operator 

Consider a complex vector space  equipped with an indefinite hermitian form .  In the theory of Krein spaces it is common to call such an hermitian form an indefinite inner product.  The following subsets are defined in terms of the square norm induced by the indefinite inner product:

 ("neutral")
 ("positive")
 ("negative")
 ("non-negative")
 ("non-positive")

A subspace  lying within  is called a neutral subspace.  Similarly, a subspace lying within  is called positive (negative) semi-definite, and a subspace lying within  is called positive (negative) definite.  A subspace in any of the above categories may be called semi-definite, and any subspace that is not semi-definite is called indefinite.

The operator  is called the (real phase) metric operator or fundamental symmetry, and may be used to define the Hilbert inner product :

On a Krein space, the Hilbert inner product is positive definite, giving  the structure of a Hilbert space (under a suitable topology).  Under the weaker constraint , some elements of the neutral subspace  may still be neutral in the Hilbert inner product, but many are not.  For instance, the subspaces  are part of the neutral subspace of the Hilbert inner product, because an element  obeys .  But an element  which happens to lie in  because  will have a positive square norm under the Hilbert inner product.

We note that the definition of the indefinite inner product as a Hermitian form implies that:

(Note: This is not correct for complex-valued Hermitian forms. It only gives the real part.)
Therefore the indefinite inner product of any two elements  which differ only by an element  is equal to the square norm of their average .

Thus  is a Hilbert space (given a suitable topology).

Properties and applications 

Krein spaces arise naturally in situations where the indefinite inner product has an analytically useful property (such as Lorentz invariance) which the Hilbert inner product lacks.  It is also common for one of the two inner products, usually the indefinite one, to be globally defined on a manifold and the other to be coordinate-dependent and therefore defined only on a local section.

In many applications the positive semi-definite inner product  depends on the chosen fundamental decomposition, which is, in general, not unique. But it may be demonstrated (e. g., cf. Proposition 1.1 and 1.2 in the paper of H. Langer below) that any two metric operators  and  compatible with the same indefinite inner product on  result in Hilbert spaces  and  whose decompositions  and  have equal dimensions. Although the Hilbert inner products on these quotient spaces do not generally coincide, they induce identical square norms, in the sense that the square norms of the equivalence classes  and  into which a given  if they are equal.

Isotropic part and degenerate subspaces 

If ,  is called non-degenerate; otherwise it is degenerate. If  for all , then the two subspaces are said to be orthogonal, and we write . If  where , we write . If, in addition, this is a direct sum, we write .

Pontryagin space 

If , the Krein space   is called a  Pontryagin space or -space. (Conventionally, the indefinite inner product is given the sign that makes  finite.) Pontrjagin spaces are named after Lev Semenovich Pontryagin.

Pesonen operator

A symmetric operator A on an indefinite inner product space K with domain K is called a Pesonen operator if (x,x) = 0 = (x,Ax) implies x = 0.

References 

 Azizov, T.Ya.; Iokhvidov, I.S. : Linear operators in spaces with an indefinite metric, John Wiley & Sons, Chichester, 1989, .
 Bognár, J. : Indefinite inner product spaces, Springer-Verlag, Berlin-Heidelberg-New York, 1974, .

 Langer, H. : Spectral functions of definitizable operators in Krein spaces, Functional Analysis Proceedings of a conference held at Dubrovnik, Yugoslavia, November 2–14, 1981, Lecture Notes in Mathematics, 948, Springer-Verlag Berlin-Heidelberg-New York, 1982, 1-46, .

Topological vector spaces
Operator theory